A neighbourhood or neighborhood is a geographically localised community within a larger city, town, suburb or rural area.

Neighbourhood or neighborhood may also refer to:

Mathematics
Neighbourhood (mathematics), a concept in topology
Neighbourhood (graph theory), a grouping in graph theory
the Moore neighborhood and Von Neumann neighborhood, used in describing cellular automata

Music
Neighbourhood (album), a 2005 album by Manu Katché
Neighborhoods (Ernest Hood album), 1975
Neighborhoods (Olu Dara album), 2001
Neighborhoods (Blink-182 album), 2011
"Neighbourhood" (song), a 1995 song by British indie rock band Space
Four songs by Arcade Fire from their 2004 album Funeral:
"Neighborhood #1 (Tunnels)"
"Neighborhood #2 (Laika)"
"Neighborhood #3 (Power Out)"
"Neighbourhood", a 2000 song by Zed Bias
Neighborhood Records, a record label
The Neighborhood (album), 1990 album by Los Lobos
The Neighbourhood, an American rock band
The Neighbourhood (album), the band's self-titled album

Other uses
Neighbourhood (South Korea), or dong, the primary division of wards (gu) in South Korea
Neighbourhood (TV series), a TV series
Neighborhood Channel, a subchannel of WQED-TV in Pittsburgh, Pennsylvania, United States
Neighborhood (role-playing game), a 1982 role-playing game
The Neighborhood (novel), 2016 novel by Mario Vargas Llosa
The Neighborhood (TV series), American comedy series
The Neighborhood (film), 2017 Canadian film
The Neighborhood, comic strip by Jerry Van Amerongen

See also
Hood (disambiguation)